is an underground station on the Odawara Line by Odakyu Electric Railway and is located in Setagaya, Tokyo, Japan.

Station layout
Setagaya-Daita Station generally has two side platforms serving two tracks. However, in the middle portion of the station it becomes one large island platform serving two tracks. The presence of walls generally separates what is a large island platform into two side platforms for most of the station. Two additional tracks run underneath the station, allowing express trains to bypass the station without stopping.

History
The station struck by an air raid during World War II and was closed from 1 July 1945, to 15 June 1946. On 20 August 1946, the station was renamed Setagaya-Daita.

The station was formerly outdoors, featuring two side platforms and two tracks. After the completion of the Odawara Line Quadruple Track Project in 2018, the station was relocated underground. The station's layout was also altered, featuring one large island platform and two tracks at the middle portion of the station and two side platforms and two tracks at the rest of the station.

Station numbering was introduced in 2014 with Setagaya-Daita being assigned station number OH08.

References

Railway stations in Japan opened in 1927
Odakyu Odawara Line
Stations of Odakyu Electric Railway
Buildings and structures in Japan destroyed during World War II
Railway stations in Tokyo